Ramadan (in Arabic رمضان) is a given name and surname. Notable people with the name include:

Given name
 Ramadan Abdel Rehim Mansour (1980–2010), Egyptian street gang leader and serial killer
 Ramadan Agab (born 1986), Sudanese footballer
 Ramadan Asswehly (1879–1920), Libyan-Turkish founder of the Tripolitanian Republic
 Ramadan Darwish (born 1998), Egyptian judoka
 Ramadan Ragap (born 1979), Egyptian footballer
 Ramadan Shalah (born 1958), leader of Palestinian Islamic Jihad
 Ramadan Sobhi (born 1997), Egyptian footballer
 Ramadan Sokoli (1920–2008), Albanian musician
 Ramadan Yasser (born 1980), Egyptian boxer

Middle name
 Mohamed Said Ramadan Al-Bouti (1929-2013), Sunni Muslim scholar
 Ahmed Ramadan Dumbuya, Sierra Leonean former politician
 Mahmoud Ramadan Elattar, Paralympian athlete from Egypt

Surname
 Ahmed Ramadan, Ghanaian politician
 Danny Ramadan (born 1984), Syrian-Canadian novelist and LGBTQ-activist
 Hani Ramadan (born 1959), Swiss Imam, son of Said
 Ibrahim Ramadan (born 1988), Egyptian weightlifter
 Ismet Ramadan (born 1998), Bulgarian footballer
 Mohamed Ramadan (disambiguation), a number of people with the name
 Said Ramadan (1926–1995), Egyptian religious scholar
 Susie Ramadan (born 1979), Australian boxer
 Taha Yassin Ramadan (1938–2007), former Vice President of Iraq
 Tariq Ramadan (born 1962), Swiss academic, son of Said
 Yousef Ramadan (born 1992), footballer
 Zekirija Ramadan (born 1978), footballer